Han Sun-hwa (born October 6, 1990), also known mononymously as Sunhwa, is a South Korean singer and actress. She is a former member of the South Korean girl group Secret. She made her television debut in 2004 while participating in SBS' Superstar Survival as a finalist, and in 2009, she was a regular cast on a variety show called Invincible Youth. Aside from music, she also ventured into acting and made her debut in the 2010 drama, More Charming By The Day. She also acted in several dramas with supporting roles in Ad Genius Lee Tae-baek, God's Gift - 14 Days, and Marriage, Not Dating.

Early life
Han Sun-hwa was born on October 6, 1990, in Busan, South Korea. She has one younger sister and one younger brother, Han Seung-woo. Han's mother gave birth to her at the young age of 20. As the eldest child, she took care of her younger siblings by cooking them food and tutoring them when both of their parents had to work. During the East Asian Financial Crisis in 1998, Han's family struggled and recalled that her dream of being an entertainer was getting dim.

Ever since she was young, Han had an interest in art and had always dreamed of becoming an artist. She took after-school art programs in elementary school and managed to win several awards from various art competitions. However, after seeing one of BoA's performances on television, she realized her dream was singing and dancing.

Career

2004–2008: Career beginnings and struggles
Since then, Han began auditioning for various recording companies; she entered the S.M. Entertainment Youth Best Competition but was eliminated. In 2004, Han started auditioning at companies besides singing competitions. In 2005, she became a finalist on a talent show called Superstar Survival along with 2PM's Taecyeon, Lee Junho and Chansung. During the show, Han received vocal and acting training; however, she was eliminated in the fifth episode and went back to Busan.

Following her setback, Han went back to being an ordinary high school student. However, there was a big change in the way Han's peers looked at her: due to false rumors, they thought she was a JYP trainee; Han admitted she became afraid of people because of the jealous stares. Teacher Sung Yong-ho, in charge of the school choir, helped Han by giving her chances to participate in competitions; then, she was admitted to Baekjae Art College. A few days before the college entrance ceremony, she got a call from an agent who watched Superstar Survival and became a trainee in TS Entertainment.

2009–2013: Secret, Invincible Youth, acting debut and rising popularity

In October 2009, Han, along with Jung Ha-na, Song Ji-eun and Jun Hyo-seong, debuted in the group Secret; prior to their debut, the group was on a documentary show called Secret Story which chronicled their debut process. In the same month, Han was chosen as a regular cast member of a South Korean variety show called Invincible Youth; the news that a girl group member who hadn't debuted yet would be selected for a variety program caused a huge sensation.

Secret released their debut single "I Want You Back" in October 2009. In April 2010, they released their first mini album entitled Secret Time which spawned the hit single "Magic" and served as their breakthrough song in South Korea. The same year, Han made her acting debut in the sitcom More Charming By The Day. She next starred in the workplace drama Ad Genius Lee Tae-baek.
On December 28, 2010, Han made a cameo appearance on MBC's daily sitcom, All My Love , playing Gain's old college friend.

In 2012, for the year end SBS Gayo Daejeon show, SBS created four idol super groups, a fan vote placed Han into the group designated Mystic White, the group working with producer Kim Do-hoon, created the song "Mermaid Princess" the profits of which was donated to charity.

2014–present: Focus on acting
In 2014, Han got her first lead role MBC's weekend drama Rosy Lovers alongside Lee Jang-woo. CNN International Seoul listed Han as one of the nine rising "it" stars in Korean entertainment citing her as a "multi-tasking" artist. The same year, her performance in tvN romance drama, Marriage, Not Dating earned her a nomination for "Best Youth Actress" at the 16th Seoul International Youth Film Festival. She also won two best new actress awards from MBC and SBS Drama Awards for her roles in Rosy Lovers and fantasy thriller God's Gift - 14 Days.

It was confirmed on September 26, 2016, that Han had not renewed her contract with TS Entertainment and would leave the company in October. On October 14, 2016, Han joined Huayi Brothers as an actress.

In 2017, Sunhwa starred in the office comedy series Radiant Office, as well as teen drama School 2017. In 2018, Sunhwa was cast in MBC's weekend drama My Contracted Husband, Mr. Oh.

In 2020, Sun-hwa was cast in the romantic-comedy drama, Backstreet Rookie, alongside Ji Chang-wook and Kim Yoo-jung, based on a webtoon of the same name. She played Dae-hyun's (Ji Chang-wook) girlfriend and former boss, also a convenience store headquarters Public Relations team leader. In July 2020, she confirmed her appearance in JTBC's drama Undercover, a remake of 2016 BBC miniseries of the same name.

In 2022, Han made a special appearance in the SBS drama Why Her. She later appeared in the drama O'PENing – First Snow, which is a solo drama with Lee Jae-in and Kang Gil-woo.

Artistry

Musical style and influences
Han has said from childhood that she has been influenced by pop and R&B groups such as Fin.K.L, S.E.S. and Shinhwa. Han credits BoA as one of her major influences and idols. She also credits BoA's singing and dancing as influencing her to pursue a musical career.

Image
 "White paper", or "baekji" in Korean, is a term coined by netizens and the cast of Invincible Youth, which is an English equivalent of the "dumb blonde" persona portrayed by Han in that show. She played a huge role in increasing Secret's popularity through Invincible Youth and other variety shows because of her dumb blonde persona.

Endorsements and other activities
Aside from her works with Secret, she also became active in acting, modelling and frequently participating in variety shows. In November 2010, Han won the best wedding dress idol award on MBC's Bouquet which landed her a magazine cover feature on Wedding 21'''s December issue.

On February 2, 2011, Han guested on the KBS's Lunar New Year special, Idol Health Beauty Contest, during which she was chosen as the star with the healthiest and most beautiful skin. Han, along with many other female idols, participated in a skin evaluation by selected professionals. In the end, results showed that Han's skin appeared 10 years younger than her actual age. In April 2011, Han was chosen as the model for the cosmetics company The Skin House. Han reportedly received a $100,000 deposit for her six-month contract. She was the company's exclusive model from 2013 until May 2016.

In February 2015, Han signed a deal with popular handbag brand St Scott London as their exclusive model for Spring/Summer 2015 collection. In August 2015, it was announced that Han, along with Super Junior's Choi Siwon, would be the honorary ambassador of the 11th Jecheon International Music & Film Festival (JIMFF).

Along with Secret, Han has been featured as a model for various endorsement deals such as Grand Mer, Nike, Nene Chicken, Good Day Soju and Parkga among others. Along with Jun Hyo-seong, B.A.P's Kim Him-chan and Bang Yong-guk, Han was chosen as a model for Kellan'' sportswear 11/12 Winter Collection in September 2011.

Discography

Singles

Filmography

Film

Television series

Web series

Television show

Web shows

Hosting

Awards and nominations

References

External links

  KeyEast

Secret (South Korean band) members
TS Entertainment artists
Actresses from Busan
Living people
South Korean female idols
K-pop singers
South Korean women pop singers
South Korean television actresses
South Korean television personalities
South Korean web series actresses
1990 births